Nakhon Si Thammarat railway station is a railway station in Tha Wang Subdistrict, Mueang Nakhon Si Thammarat district, Nakhon Si Thammarat province. It is a class 1 railway station  from Bangkok. This station opened in October 1914 as part of the Southern Line section Khao Chum Thong Junction–Nakhon Si Thammarat.

Train services 
 Express train No. 85 / 86 Bangkok–Nakhon Si Thammarat–Bangkok
 Rapid train No. 173 / 174 Bangkok–Nakhon Si Thammarat–Bangkok
 Local train No. 451/452 Nakhon Si Thammarat–Sungai Kolok–Nakhon Si Thammarat
 Local train No. 455/456 Nakhon Si Thammarat–Yala–Nakhon Si Thammarat
 Local train No. 457/458 Nakhon Si Thammarat–Phatthalung–Nakhon Si Thammarat

References 
 
 
 
 

Railway stations in Thailand